The FIS Ski Flying World Championships 2014 took place from 14 to 16 March 2014 in Harrachov, Czech Republic for the fourth time. Harrachov hosted the event previously in 1983, 1992 and 2002. Individually Robert Kranjec was the defending champion. Austrian teammates Thomas Morgenstern. Andreas Kofler, Gregor Schlierenzauer and Martin Koch were the defending team champions.

The venue as the FIS Ski Flying World Championships 2014 was chosen at the 47th International Ski Congress in Antalya, Turkey on 3 June 2010.

Severin Freund of Germany became the individual champion after two series of jumps, since the last two series were cancelled due to bad weather conditions. Because of the same reason, the team event was cancelled as well.

Schedule

Results

Qualifying

Individual

References

External links
Official website 

FIS Ski Flying World Championships
Sport in Harrachov
2014 in ski jumping
2014 in Czech sport
Ski jumping competitions in the Czech Republic
International sports competitions hosted by the Czech Republic
March 2014 sports events in Europe